A constitutional referendum was held in Tunisia on 21 October 1945 as part of the wider French constitutional referendum. The first question on the new French National Assembly serving as a constituent assembly was approved by 99% of voters, whilst the temporary constitution proposed in the second question was approved by 79% of voters. Both proposals were also approved in the overall vote. Voter turnout was 69.2%.

Results

Question I

Question II

References

1945 referendums
October 1945 events in Africa
1945
1945 in Tunisia